The 2007 Arab Athletics Championships was the fifteenth edition of the international athletics competition between Arab countries which took place in Amman, Jordan from 18–21 May. The competition was held earlier than its usual scheduling due to the 2007 Pan Arab Games being held in November.

Medal summary

Men

Women

Medal table

Overall

Men

Women

See also
Athletics at the 2007 Pan Arab Games

References

 Al Batal Al Arabi(N°:64). Arab Athletics Union. Retrieved on 2015-02-14.
 Championnats arabes, Amman (Jordanie) 18-21/05 . Africa Athle. Retrieved on 2013-11-02.

Arab Athletics Championships
International athletics competitions hosted by Jordan
Sports competitions in Amman
Arab Athletics Championships
Arab Athletics Championships
21st century in Amman